Broadcasting Act (with its variations) is a stock short title used for legislation in Canada, Hong Kong, Malaysia, the Republic of Ireland and the United Kingdom that relates to broadcasting. The Bill for an Act with this short title will usually have been known as a Broadcasting Bill during its passage through Parliament.

Broadcasting Acts may be a generic name either for legislation bearing that short title or for all legislation which relates to broadcasting.

List

Canada
 The Canadian Radio Broadcasting Act, 1932 which established the Canadian Radio Broadcasting Commission.
 The Broadcasting Act, 1958, that took the private-sector regulatory function of the Canadian Broadcasting Corporation, the public broadcaster and created the Board of Broadcast Governors, a separate regulatory agency for private broadcasters.
 The Broadcasting Act, 1968, that established the Canadian Radio-television Telecommunications Commission with oversight over both public and private broadcasting, and updated the mandate of the Canadian Broadcasting Corporation
 The Broadcasting Act, 1991, that amended both the Broadcasting Act, 1968, and the since-separated Canadian Radio-television and Telecommunications Act, 1976

Hong Kong
 The Broadcasting Ordinance 2000

Malaysia
 The Broadcasting Act 1988

Republic of Ireland
 The Broadcasting (Amendment) Act 2007

Singapore 

 Broadcasting Act (Singapore)

United Kingdom

See also
 List of short titles 
 Communications Act
 The Television Act 1954, Television Act 1963, Television Act 1964

References

Lists of legislation by short title